Robert Phillip DeCourcy (June 12, 1927 – March 25, 2012) was a Canadian professional ice hockey goaltender who played in one National Hockey League game for the New York Rangers during the 1947–48 season. He died in Alliston, Ontario, on March 25, 2012, at the age of 84.

Playing career
DeCourcy played with the New York Rovers of the Eastern Hockey League. His lone NHL game came on November 12, 1947 against the Boston Bruins. He replaced regular Rangers goalie Chuck Rayner and played 29 minutes, giving up six goals.

Career statistics

Regular season and playoffs

See also
 List of players who played only one game in the NHL

References

External links
 

1927 births
2012 deaths
Canadian expatriate ice hockey players in the United States
Canadian ice hockey goaltenders
Kansas City Pla-Mors players
New York Rangers players
New York Rovers players
Omaha Knights (USHL) players
Ontario Hockey Association Senior A League (1890–1979) players
St. Michael's Buzzers players
St. Paul Saints (USHL) players
Ice hockey people from Toronto
Toronto St. Michael's Majors players